The Somerset Archaeological and Natural History Society was founded in 1849. The Society bought Taunton Castle in 1874, and leases it to Somerset County Council to house the Museum of Somerset. A substantial proportion of the items held by the Museum were originally collected by the Society. Since it opened in 2010, the Society's office and library have been located at the Somerset Heritage Centre, alongside the County Council's Heritage Service.

History
The society was founded in 1849, by members of Taunton's society who had an interest in history and archeology and by 1851 it had grown to 420 members. It was originally based at the Victoria Rooms in Taunton until in 1874, the society purchased Taunton Castle for its new base of operations. The castle was purchased for £2,850 and the society funded repairs to the castle, including a new roof for the large 'Somerset Room' in 1884, the refitting of the Great Hall to be a museum in 1899, and the creation of a library in 1908.

The society was responsible for excavations at Glastonbury Abbey during the early 20th century, but the Director of Excavations, Frederick Bligh Bond, had to be dismissed as he claimed he had been helped by ghosts of Glastonbury monks. The present museum at the castle was fitted during mid 20th century, and around the same time the 18th-century staircase from St Mary Redcliffe's vicarage was installed in the Great Hall. Taunton Castle is now leased to Somerset County Council and its museum has become the Museum of Somerset.

Journal
The Society has published an annual journal, the Proceedings, since 1851 which contains scholarly papers on research into the history, archaeology and ecology of Somerset. It also occasionally publishes books, most recently a transcription of Edmund Rack's Survey of Somerset, a comprehensive survey of the county carried out in the late eighteenth century.

Notable members
Professor Mick Aston, well-known due to his involvement with the Time Team archaeology programmes on Channel 4, was a member and Past President of the Society, and regularly contributed papers to the Proceedings.

Robin Bush, the archivist and historian, was Chairman of the Somerset Archaeological and Natural History Society in 1983–84.

References

Archaeology of England
Clubs and societies in Somerset
Archaeological organizations
Historical societies of the United Kingdom
1849 establishments in England
Organizations established in 1849
Natural history societies
Organisations based in Taunton